Regina Parra (born 1984) - Brazilian contemporary artist

Regina Parra exhibited at Jewish Museum (Manhattan), Pablo Atchugarry Art Center  (Miami), Mana Contemporary (Chicago), Shiva Gallery (NY), PAC_Padiglione d’Arte Contemporanea (Milan), On Curating Project Space (Zurich), Galeria Senda (Barcelona), MASP, Pinacoteca de São Paulo, MAM, Instituto Tomie Ohtake, Pivô, CCSP, Parque Lage, Paço das Artes, Fundação Marcos Amaro, Instituto Figueiredo Ferraz.

Residencies and awards 
In 2010, 2017, 2018 and 2019 Parra was nominated to PIPA Prize,
Regina Parra was awarded residencies including: Monira Foundation Residency Program, Mana Contemporary, New Jersey, The Watermill Center Residency Program, Watermill, Annex_B, New York, Residency Unlimited, New York, Pivô Residency Program, São Paulo, Red Bull House of Art, São Paulo.

Collections 

Parra's work is held in the permanent collections of the Museu de arte de São Paulo, and the Pinacoteca de São Paulo.

Further reading

References

External links 

Brazilian contemporary artists
Brazilian women painters
Brazilian painters
Living people
1984 births